The Best House in London is a 1969 British comedy film directed by Philip Saville and starring David Hemmings, Joanna Pettet, George Sanders, Warren Mitchell, John Bird, Maurice Denham and Bill Fraser.

Cast
 David Hemmings – Benjamin Oakes / Walter Leybourne
 Joanna Pettet – Josephie Pacefoot
 George Sanders – Sir Francis Leybourne
 Dany Robin – Babette
 Warren Mitchell – Count Pandolfo
 John Bird – Home Secretary
 Jan Holden – Lady Dilke
 William Rushton – Sylvester Wall
 Bill Fraser – Inspector MacPherson
 Maurice Denham – Editor of The Times newspaper
 Wolfe Morris – Chinese Trade Attache
 Martita Hunt – Headmistress
 Arnold Diamond – Charles Dickens
 Hugh Burden – Lord Tennyson
 Avril Angers – Flora's Mother
 Betty Marsden – Felicity
 Tessie O'Shea – Singer
 Arthur Howard - Mr. Fortnum
 Clement Freud - Mr. Mason
 Peter Jeffrey – Sherlock Holmes
 Thorley Walters – Doctor Watson
 John Cleese – Jones
 Margaret Nolan – Prostitute
 Penny Spencer – Evelyn
 Veronica Carlson – Lily

References

External links

1969 films
British historical comedy films
1960s historical comedy films
Films directed by Philip Saville
Films set in London
Films set in the 19th century
Metro-Goldwyn-Mayer films
1960s English-language films
1960s British films